Wuchuan Gelao and Miao Autonomous County (alternatively ) is a county in the northeast of Guizhou province, China, bordering Chongqing to the north. It is under the administration of Zunyi city.

Climate

Education

Jiaoba Township Central Primary School is in the county. In 2017 it had about 1,000 students, with about 100 using the school's boarding facilities, which have eight dormitories. That year the principal stated that families often tried their best to not have their children live on campus, and described the dormitories as being "poor"; The Economist stated that relative to other area primary schools its facilities were better than average.

References

 
County-level divisions of Guizhou
Gelao autonomous counties
Miao autonomous counties
Zunyi